Sakīna bint al-Ḥusayn (born between 47 AH and 51 AH or between 667 CE and 671 CE; died on the 5th of Rabi' al-Awwal, 117 AH or 735 CE), originally named Āmina, was the daughter of Husayn ibn Ali and Rubab bint Imra al-Qais.

Life

Name and Title
Sakīna, Sukayna or Sukaina is an Arabic female given name that means to "Tranquility, or Peace of Reassurance". In various sources, her original name is mentioned as Āmina or Amīna or Umayma. Sakina is a title given to her by her mother as she was so calm, tranquil, and peaceful.

Birth 
There is no report of the exact date of birth of Amina in historical sources. Amina was a ten or fourteen-year-old girl at the Battle of Karbala. She was probably born between 47 AH and 51 AH.

Lineage
Sakina was the daughter of Husayn ibn Ali, son of Fatima, daughter of the Islamic prophet Muhammad and Ali, the first Shia Imam and the fourth of the "rightly guided" (rāshidūn) caliphs in Sunni Islam. Her father is the third Shia Imam who was killed by Yazid I in the Battle of Karbala. Her mother was Rubab bint Imra al-Qais. Her brothers included Ali ibn Husayn Zayn al-Abidin, Ali al-Akbar ibn Husayn, and Ali al-Asghar ibn Husayn, and her sisters included Fatima al-Sughra and Ruqayya.

Battle of Karbala 
According to historical sources, there are many narrations about the presence of Amina in the caravan of Husayn ibn Ali when he traveled from Mecca to Kufa in Iraq at the invitation of the people of Kufa and the battle of Karbala. There are many reports and quotes from Sakina about the events of Ashura and the Battle of Karbala including when Ali al-Akbar was killed and the night of Ashura. Ibn Shahrashub narrates in the book Manaqib Ale Abi Talib, in Husayn's last farewell to his family that he advised her to be patient. According to many maqatils and many other historical accounts such as al-Muhabbar, Sakina was married to one of Imam al-Hasan's sons, namely Abd Allah al-Akbar ibn al-Hasan (Abu Bakr ibn al-Hasan). However the marriage was never consummated due to Abd Allah's martyrdom in Karbala.

Captivity

Kufa
After the Battle of the Karbala, Umar ibn Sa'd's army captured Husayn's family and Amina's name is  mentioned among the captives. She was taken to Kufa and then to Damascus along with other members family of Muhammad, the prophet of Islam as captives, along with the heads of the dead. According to Sayyed Ibn Tawus in Lohoof, On the 11th day of Muharram (14 October 680 AD), after the event of Ashura, Umar ibn Sa'd's army forced the caravan of captives toward the battleground and passed them by the bodies of the dead. After the captives passed through the streets and markets of Kufa, the soldiers entered the palace of Ubayd Allah ibn Ziyad. al-Shaykh al-Mufid in Kitab al-Irshad narrated the date of arrival of captives to Kufa on 12 Muharram (15 October 680 AD).

Narrative and history reports 
After the Battle of the Karbala, she was taken to Kufa and Damascus along with other members of the family of Muhammad, the prophet of Islam, as captives, along with the heads of the dead raising upon the lances or hung from the necks of horses by the forces of Yazid. Sayyed Ibn Tawus in Lohoof quoted, that on the 11th day of Muharram, after the event of Ashura, Umar ibn Sa'd's army forced the caravan of captives toward the battleground and passed them by the bodies of the dead. When Husayn's family was bidding farewell to the bodies of the dead, Sakina hugged his father's headless body but Umar ibn Sa'd's soldiers forcibly separated her from her father and dragged her to other captives. According to the sources, after passing the captives through the streets and markets of Kufa, soldiers entered the palace of Ubayd Allah ibn Ziyad, riding bareheaded camels with a rope tied around their hands and neck.

Damascus 
Al-Baladhuri reported in Genealogies of the Nobles, that the captives were moved from Kufa to Levant by Shimr on bareheaded camels. The exact route of the caravan from Kufa to Damascus is unknown, but considering the places related to Husayn in that region, the possible route toward Damascus is determined. On 1 safar (3 November 680 AD) the captives entered Damascus through Bab Tuma or Bab al-Saat with the heads of the dead. Most historians like Al-Tabari have reported that the captives stayed in Damascus between 3 and 7 days. Tawus reported it as one month but he did not consider the report valid.

Narrative and history reports 
Al-Baladhuri reported in Genealogies of the Nobles, that the captives were moved from Kufa to Levant by Shimr on bareheaded camels. The exact route of the caravan from Kufa to Damascus is unknown, but considering the places related to Husayn in that region including Al-Nuqtah Mosque, Maqam Ra's Husayn (shrine of the head of Husayn) in mosul and the possible route toward Damascus can be determined. 

The city was decorated and people came to watch. The captives were taken to Umayyad Mosque. After that, soldiers brought the captives into the Yazid's court while they were rope tied to each other. Narratives said that in the presence of the captives, Yazid had put Hussain's head in a golden bowl and hit it with his cane. Ibn Babawayh in Al-Amali (Ibn Babawayh) and Mohammad-Baqer Majlesi in Bihar al-Anwar narrated in response to the words of the people of Sham that, "we have not seen better captives than them." Sakina said, "we are the captives of the Prophet's family."

Return to Medina
Sakina returned to Medina after passing through Karbala with other members of the caravan of captives. There are not many authentic and reliable reports about her life in Medina until her death.

Death 
There are disagreements among historians about the death of Sakina and her burial place. According to the majority of sources , the date of her death was mentioned on 5 Rabi' al-Awwal 117 (4 April 735) in Medina. She was buried in Al-Baqi Cemetery. There is a tomb attributed to Sakina in Bab al-Saghir Cemetery in Damascus. There is a tomb in Cairo, Egypt and another tomb in Tiberias, Palestine, also attributed to Sakina.

See also 
 Adnanites
 Arabs
 Banu Hashim
 Family tree of Husayn ibn Ali
 Fatima
 Fatimah bint Musa
 Quraysh
 Ruqayya bint Ali
 Semite
 Ruqayya bint Husayn

References 

Arab women
Muslim martyrs
Family of Muhammad
Battle of Karbala
676 births
Women in medieval warfare
Women in war in the Middle East
7th-century women
Muslim figures favored in Shia Islam
7th-century Arabs
8th-century Arabs
Husayn ibn Ali
Arab women in war
Women from the Umayyad Caliphate
Child deaths